The 1966 Inter-Cities Fairs Cup Final was the final of the eighth Inter-Cities Fairs Cup. It was played on 14 September and 21 September 1966 between Barcelona and Real Zaragoza of Spain. Barcelona won the tie 4–3 on aggregate.

Route to the final

Match details

First leg

Second leg 

Barcelona win 4–3 on aggregate

See also 
 1965–66 Inter-Cities Fairs Cup
 FC Barcelona in international football competitions

Notes

References 

 RSSSF

2
Inter-Cities Fairs Cup Final 1966
Inter-Cities Fairs Cup Final 1966
1966
International club association football competitions hosted by Spain
1965–66 in Spanish football
Inter-Cities Fairs Cup Final
Sports competitions in Barcelona
Inter-Cities Fairs Cup Final
Inter-Cities Fairs Cup Final, 1966